American singer and songwriter Michael Jackson recorded songs for ten studio albums, two posthumous studio albums, seventy two compilation albums, three soundtrack albums, one live album and seven remix albums. He has provided background vocals for songs recorded by other artists, as well as featured on duets.

Jackson debuted on the professional music scene at age five as a member of The Jackson 5. The group set a chart record when its first four singles—"I Want You Back" (1969), "ABC" (1970), "The Love You Save" (1970), and "I'll Be There" (1970)—peaked at number one on the Billboard Hot 100. As Jackson began to emerge as a solo performer in the early 1970s, he maintained ties to the Jackson 5 and Motown. Between 1972 and 1975, Michael released four solo studio albums with Motown: Got to Be There (1972), Ben (1972), Music & Me (1973), and Forever, Michael (1975). "Got to Be There" and "Ben", the title tracks from his first two solo albums, became successful singles, as did a cover of Bobby Day's "Rockin' Robin". In June 1975, the Jackson 5 signed with Epic Records, a subsidiary of CBS Records, and released six more albums between 1976 and 1984. Michael, the group's lead songwriter during this time, wrote hits such as "Shake Your Body (Down to the Ground)" (1979), "This Place Hotel" (1980), and "Can You Feel It" (1980). Jackson's fifth solo album, Off the Wall (1979), co-produced by Jackson and Quincy Jones. Songwriters for the album included Jackson, Rod Temperton, Stevie Wonder, and Paul McCartney. Off the Wall was the first solo album to generate four top 10 hits in the United States: "Off the Wall", "She's Out of My Life", and the chart-topping singles "Don't Stop 'Til You Get Enough" and "Rock with You". This album helped Jackson win three awards at the American Music Awards and a Grammy Award for his solo efforts. Jackson recorded with Queen singer Freddie Mercury from 1981 to 1983, including a demo of "State of Shock", "Victory", and "There Must Be More to Life Than This". Jackson went on to record the single "State of Shock" with Mick Jagger for The Jacksons' album Victory (1984). In 1982, Jackson combined his interests in songwriting and film when he contributed the song "Someone in the Dark" to the storybook for the film E.T. the Extra-Terrestrial. The song, with Jones as its producer, won a Grammy for Best Recording for Children in 1983.

Jackson's sixth album, Thriller, was released in late 1982. The album earned Jackson seven Grammys and eight American Music Awards. Thriller was the first album to have seven Billboard Hot 100 top 10 singles, including "Billie Jean", "Beat It", and "Wanna Be Startin' Somethin'". Jackson's seventh album Bad (1987) produced nine singles with seven charting in the United States. Five of these singles ("I Just Can't Stop Loving You", "Bad", "The Way You Make Me Feel", "Man in the Mirror", and "Dirty Diana") reached number one on the Billboard Hot 100, a record for most number-one Hot 100 singles from any one album. In 1991, he released his eighth album, Dangerous, co-produced with Teddy Riley. The album produced four top ten singles on the Billboard Hot 100, including one number-one hit "Black or White", "Remember the Time", "In the Closet" and "Will You Be There" which produced and performed by Jackson the theme for the film Free Willy. In June 1995, Jackson released his ninth album, HIStory: Past, Present and Future, Book I, a double album. The first disc, HIStory Begins, is a 15-track greatest hits album. The second disc, HIStory Continues, contains 13 original songs and two cover versions. The album features hits like "Scream", a duet with Jackson's youngest sister Janet Jackson, "Earth Song", "They Don't Care About Us", and "You Are Not Alone". "You Are Not Alone" holds the Guinness World Record for the first song ever to debut at number one on the Billboard Hot 100 chart. Jackson worked with collaborators including Teddy Riley and Rodney Jerkins to produce his tenth solo album, Invincible (2001). Invincible spawned three singles, "You Rock My World", "Cry", and "Butterflies".

Michael Jackson's recorded music also encompasses providing background vocals for other artists like Diana Ross, Stevie Wonder, La Toya Jackson, Rebbie Jackson, Janet Jackson, Barry Gibb, and 3T. He collaborated with singers and musicians including The Jackson 5, Paul McCartney, and Freddie Mercury.

Songs

Songs with background vocals contributions

See also
 Michael Jackson albums discography
 Michael Jackson singles discography
 Michael Jackson videography
 List of unreleased Michael Jackson songs
 List of songs recorded by The Jackson 5

References

 
Jackson, Michael